Amanat (Amanat) is a 2016 Kazakhstani drama film directed by Satybaldy Narymbetov. The film was selected as the Kazakhstani entry for the Best Foreign Language Film at the 89th Academy Awards but it was not nominated.

Cast
 Berik Aitzhanov as Ermukhan

See also
 List of submissions to the 89th Academy Awards for Best Foreign Language Film
 List of Kazakhstani submissions for the Academy Award for Best Foreign Language Film

References

External links
 

2016 films
2016 drama films
Kazakh-language films
Kazakhstani drama films